Jean de l'Or Carolus Tsaralaza (born 24 February 1985 in Analamanga) is a Malagasy footballer, who is currently playing for St. Louis Suns United.

Club career
Tsaralaza began his career with AS Adema in the THB Champions League and joined in January 2009 to St. Louis Suns United.

International career
A member of the national squad, Tsaralaza is a midfielder and one of the main players of the team.

References

1985 births
Living people
Malagasy footballers
Madagascar international footballers
Association football midfielders
Malagasy expatriate footballers
Expatriate footballers in Seychelles
Malagasy expatriate sportspeople in Seychelles
Saint Louis Suns United FC players